is a 2012 Japanese television drama series. This television series is inspired by the teen court justice system found in the United States. Teen courts allows teenagers who commit minor offenses to be tried by other teenagers, and they follow the concept of restorative justice.

Cast
 Ayame Goriki as Misato Nyakouji
Kōji Seto as Saburo Takada
Eri Murakawa
Ren Mori
Hiroki Konno
Kensuke Owada
Azuma Mikihisa
Maeda Beverly

Episodes

References

External links
  

2012 Japanese television series debuts
Nippon TV dramas
Japanese drama television series
2012 Japanese television series endings
Television series about teenagers